Flatlands Dutch Reformed Church, also known as Flatlands Reformed Church, is a historic Dutch Reformed church at Kings Highway and East 40th Street in the Flatlands neighborhood of Brooklyn, New York. The complex consists of the church, administration building, and cemetery. The congregation was founded in 1654. The church was built in 1848 in the Greek Revival style. The Greek Revival administration building was constructed in 1904; it was enlarged in the 1920s. The cemetery contains about 1,500 burials dating to 1660.

It was listed on the National Register of Historic Places in 1979.

References

External links
Official Church Website

Churches in Brooklyn
Dutch-American culture in New York City
Dutch Reformed Church buildings
Flatlands, Brooklyn
Properties of religious function on the National Register of Historic Places in Brooklyn
Churches completed in 1848
New York City Designated Landmarks in Brooklyn
Reformed churches in New York City